Çıraqlı is a village in the municipality of Qərvənd in the Agdam District of Azerbaijan, which was ruined during the First Nagorno-Karabakh War. The village was located on the Nagorno-Karabakh Line of Contact until the 2020 Nagorno-Karabakh war, during which it was frequently hit by missiles by the Armenian Army.

References

Populated places in Aghdam District